"Wheels" is a single by American rock band Foo Fighters. The single premiered on radio on September 23, 2009, though the single was officially released six days later.

Background
The song had its live premiere at the White House as part of an Independence Day celebration honoring military service members.

The song "Wheels", alongside the song "Word Forward", was recorded for the band's Greatest Hits album with producer Butch Vig. Both songs were written during the Echoes, Silence, Patience & Grace tour and had their first versions recorded at Grand Master Studios in Hollywood in 2008, later being recorded at the Foo Fighters's own Studio 606 in Los Angeles. Lead vocalist Dave Grohl invited Vig to work on the songs while at a party, and the successful outcome led Grohl to invite him to produce the band's next album Wasting Light.

Reception

Critical
Benjamin Sheehan from Billboard magazine says:
"The song has a Weezer-meets-The Fray vibe, and it flies out of the gate with feedback-laden riffs, well-timed stutter stops and a gentle balance of electric and acoustic guitars. Four-chord loops nicely underscore Grohl's frustration as he mourns life's failure to meet his expectations. Grohl sings during the opening verse, 'I wanted something better, man/I wished for something new'. For an act of this stature and talent, it's hard not to agree just a little". Alternatively, Pitchfork described the song as: "particularly aggravating, sounding something like a half-hearted attempt at a country-rock crossover."

Commercial
The song debuted at #73 on the Billboard Hot 100, which was their highest charting Billboard Hot 100 single since their 2007 hit "The Pretender". The song topped the Hot Rock Songs charts for two consecutive weeks.

Music video
A music video was directed by Sam Brown, featuring the band performing in an old warehouse. The video premiered in the early hours of October 1, 2009 on AMTV.

Track listing

Charts

Weekly charts

Year-end charts

References

External links
 

2009 singles
Foo Fighters songs
Songs written by Dave Grohl
Rock ballads
2009 songs
Song recordings produced by Butch Vig
RCA Records singles
Songs written by Taylor Hawkins
Songs written by Nate Mendel
Songs written by Chris Shiflett